USS Hermitage may refer to:

 , a troop transport launched in 1925 as the Italian liner ; interned, renamed, and commissioned in U.S. Navy, 1942; returned to Italy in 1947.
 , a Thomaston-class dock landing ship launched in 1956; transferred to Brazilian Navy as Ceará (C-30) in 1989

United States Navy ship names